Aspidoscelis franciscensis, the San Francisco Island whiptail, is a species of teiid lizard endemic to San Francisco Island in Mexico.

References

franciscensis
Reptiles described in 1921
Taxa named by John Van Denburgh
Taxa named by Joseph Richard Slevin
Reptiles of Mexico